TYC 8998-760-1 is a young star, about  old, located 310 light years away in the constellation of Musca, with a mass  times the Sun.

Planetary system
There are two giant exoplanets orbiting the star. The European Southern Observatory's Very Large Telescope photographed the two planets using its SPHERE instrument, producing the first direct image of multiple planets orbiting a Sun-like star.

In July 2021, astronomers reported the detection, for the first time, of an isotope in the atmosphere of an exoplanet; more specifically, the isotope Carbon-13 (C13) was found in the atmosphere.

References 

K-type subgiants
Planetary systems with two confirmed planets
Musca (constellation)